A timeline of dendrochronology timestamped events.

Timelines

Timeline from all sub-regions

Cliff dwellings, etc, the Americas

for the Americas, see also: Timeline of Chacoan history

References

Dendrology
Dendrochronology
Dendrochronology